The High Level Bridge is a Canadian short documentary film, directed by Trevor Anderson and released in 2010. The film centres on the High Level Bridge in Edmonton, Alberta, blending historical facts about the bridge with a memorial tribute to residents of the city who had committed suicide by jumping off of it.

The film influenced the city to launch a safety study on the bridge, culminating in the construction of suicide barriers along the bridge in 2015.

The film premiered at the 2010 Toronto International Film Festival. It was subsequently screened at the 2010 AFI Fest, where it received an honorable mention from the short film jury, and at the 2011 Sundance Film Festival.

References

External links

2010 films
2010 short documentary films
Canadian short documentary films
Films shot in Edmonton
Films set in Edmonton
English-language Canadian films
Films directed by Trevor Anderson
2010s English-language films
2010s Canadian films
Documentary films about suicide